The Great & the Small is a 2016 drama film written and directed by Dusty Bias. It stars Nick Fink, Ritchie Coster, Melanie Lynskey, Louisa Krause, and Ann Dowd.

Plot synopsis
Scott, a twenty-six year old living on the streets, is trying to find his way back into society - and build bridges with his ex-girlfriend - while on probation for petty crimes.

Cast
 Nick Fink as Scott
 Ritchie Coster as Richie
 Melanie Lynskey as Margaret
 Louisa Krause as Nessa 
 Ann Dowd as Detective Dupre

Awards
The film received the Audience Choice prize and the Jury Award for Best American Independent Feature at the 2016 Sonoma International Film Festival.

Reception
On Rotten Tomatoes the film has 2 critic reviews, both positive. 
Gary Goldstein, writing for the Los Angeles Times, felt that it "sneaks in quite a bit of depth and emotional punch," while Joe Leydon of Variety called the film "At once starkly eccentric and deeply humane," adding that Lynskey's portrayal of "sad-eyed schoolteacher" Margaret was "quietly devastating."

References

External links
 
 The Great & The Small – Q&A with Director Dusty Bias

2016 films
2016 drama films
American drama films
2010s English-language films
2010s American films